5160 may refer to:

 a number in the 5000 range.

Time
 A.D.5160, a year in the 6th millennium CE
 5160 BCE, a year in the 6th millennium BC

Astronomy
 5160 Camoes, an asteroid located in the main asteroid belt

Postal codes
 a postal code in Portugal, see List of postal codes in Portugal

Electronics
 IBM PC/XT, the IBM model 5160 computer
 Inspiron 5160, a computer from Dell
 Nokia 5160, a cellphone
 Xeon 5160, a microprocessor, see List of Intel Xeon microprocessors

Other uses
 5160, a grade of spring steel, see List of blade materials

See also